Nikola is a rural locality (a village) and the administrative center of Nikolskoye Rural Settlement, Ustyuzhensky District, Vologda Oblast, Russia. The population was 567 as of 2002. There are 7 streets.

Geography 
Gorka is the nearest rural locality.

References 

Rural localities in Ustyuzhensky District